Lyndon B. Johnson High School may refer to:

Lyndon B. Johnson High School (Austin, Texas), in Austin, Texas
Lyndon B. Johnson High School (Johnson City, Texas), in Johnson City, Texas
Lyndon B. Johnson High School (Laredo, Texas), in Laredo, Texas

See also
 LBJ School (disambiguation)
 Lyndon Institute, a private high school in Lyndon, Vermont
 Lyndon School (disambiguation)